HMS Doon was a Hawthorn Leslie type River-class destroyer ordered by the Royal Navy under the 1903 – 1904 Naval Estimates. Named after the River Doon in western Scotland, she was the first ship to carry this name in the Royal Navy.

Construction
She was laid down on 16 February 1904 at the Hawthorn Leslie shipyard at Hebburn-on-Tyne and launched on 8 November 1904. She was completed in June 1905.  Her original armament was to be the same as the Turtleback torpedo boat destroyers that preceded her.  In 1906 the Admiralty decided to upgrade the armament by landing the five 6-pounder naval guns and shipping three 12-pounder 8 hundredweight (cwt) guns. Two would be mounted abeam at the foc's'le break and the third gun would be mounted on the quarterdeck.

Prewar
After commissioning she was assigned to the East Coast Destroyer Flotilla of the 1st Fleet and based at Harwich.

On 27 April 1908 the Eastern Flotilla departed Harwich for live fire and night manoeuvres. During these exercises  rammed and sank  then damaged .

In July 1908 Doon entered refit and had a new propeller shaft fitted at Sheerness Dockyard, returning to the Channel Fleet destroyer Flotilla at the end of September. On the night of 2/3 March 1909, Doon, which had set off from Portland Harbour with the destroyer  to escort the Royal yacht Alexandra from Dover to Calais, collided with the steam trawler Halcyon. The trawler sank, with all of her crew rescued by Doon, while Doons bow was badly damaged, forcing her to put into Portsmouth for repair. In April 1909 she was assigned to the 3rd Destroyer Flotilla on its formation at Harwich. She remained until displaced by a Basilisk-class destroyer by May 1912. She was assigned to the 5th Destroyer Flotilla of the 2nd Fleet with a nucleus crew.

On 30 August 1912 the Admiralty directed all destroyer classes were to be designated by alpha characters starting with the letter 'A'. The ships of the River class were assigned to the E class. After 30 September 1913, she was known as an E-class destroyer and had the letter ‘E’ painted on the hull below the bridge area and on either the fore or aft funnel.

World War I
The 9th Flotilla was a Patrol Flotilla tasked with anti-submarine and counter mining patrols in the Firth of Forth area.

During the German Raid on Hartlepool, she was damaged by German shellfire. She was straddled by three salvoes with one near miss by an  shell grazing the after edge of the foremost funnel, damaging a Berthon collapsible lifeboat, before going overboard and bursting on impact with the water. She suffered splinter damage and had her wireless, aft gun and torpedo tube put out of action. She suffered three dead and six wounded.

In August 1915 with the amalgamation of the 9th and 7th Flotillas she was deployed to the 7th Destroyer Flotilla based at the River Humber.  She remained employed on the Humber Patrol, participating in counter mining operations and anti-submarine patrols for the remainder of the war.

Disposition
In 1919 she was paid off and laid up in reserve awaiting disposal. On 27 May 1919 she was sold to Thos. W. Ward of Sheffield for breaking at Rainham, Kent, on the Thames Estuary.

She was not awarded a Battle Honour for her service

Pennant numbers

References

Bibliography
 
 
 
 
 
 
 

 

River-class destroyers
Ships built on the River Tyne
1904 ships